Alexander Negris (1805 - 1860/80) was a military colonel, author, philologist, and professor.  He participated in the Greek War of Independence with other members of his family; indeed, he was a member of the phanariots family's Negris and Ypsilanti.  He was the first lecturer of Modern Greek at Harvard University and set the framework for Evangelinos Apostolides Sophocles.  He was a Greek language philologist and linguist and wrote countless books in Greek for the education of the English-speaking world. 
Negris was a member of different organizations all over the world and honorary member of the Archaeological Society of Athens.  The Ypsilanti township in Michigan is named after his uncle Demetrios Ypsilantis.

History
Alexander was born in Constantinople.  The family was part of the Faneri district of Constantinople.  His father was Alexander and his mother was Eleni.  His grandfather was Constantine Ypsilantis.  His uncles were Alexander Ypsilantis and Demetrios Ypsilantis.   Alexander became a member of the Filiki Eteria.   They were one of the most important family alliances of the Greek War of Independence.  He briefly visited Russia.  When Alexander was sixteen the Greek War of Independence broke out and he was an active participant.  He was the General Secretary for Western Greece.  Towards the end of the 1820s he was dispatched to the United States.  His cousin Konstantinos Negris was sent to study in France by Alexandros Mavrokordatos.  While Alexander was in the United States he lectured at Harvard University and began to publish books. 

By 1829,  he traveled to Edinburgh Scotland.  He published more books in Scotland.  In 1838, he met Eliza Sweet in London.  They got married and lived in Scotland.  He eventually became a professor at the University of Glasgow.  In 1839, he lived at 13 Clyde Street in Edinburgh Scotland. In 1846, they also lived at Saint Georg Square in the same city.  He traveled back and forth to Greece.   By 1852, he cowrote a church book with Alexandrou Sturza.  The book was in Greek and Russian.

Literary

References

Bibliography

Greek people of the Greek War of Independence
1805 births
19th-century Greek educators
Writers from Istanbul
Constantinopolitan Greeks
Greek emigrants to the United States
19th-century Greek Americans
19th-century Greek writers
19th-century Greek American writers
Ypsilantis family
Phanariotes
Academics from Istanbul
Military personnel from Istanbul
Year of death uncertain